Distrato is a village and a former community in the Ioannina regional unit, Epirus, Greece. Since the 2011 local government reform it is part of the municipality Konitsa, of which it is a municipal unit. The municipal unit has an area of 53.837 km2. Population 278 (2011).

References

Populated places in Ioannina (regional unit)